Hesdy Gerges (born February 20, 1984) is a Dutch kickboxer and mixed martial artist, fighting out of the Vos Gym in Amsterdam, Netherlands. He held the It's Showtime World Heavyweight title between 2010 and 2012. Gerges has competed in the K-1, It's Showtime, SUPERKOMBAT and Glory promotions.

Gerges was convicted and sentenced to 54 months in prison for drug-trafficking, but didn't have to do any jail time on the condition that he wouldn't commit a crime in Belgium over the next five years.

Biography and career
Born in Amsterdam, Netherlands, he began training in kickboxing in 2001. He joined the Chakuriki Gym and trained under Thom Harinck who has also trained Badr Hari. Gerges was a notorious delinquent outside of the ring who, according to Harinck, was even worse than Badr Hari.

On October 17, 2009, at Ultimate Glory 11: A Decade of Fights in Amsterdam he defeated Ruslan Karaev by unanimous decision.

On May 29, 2010, at It's Showtime 2010 Amsterdam he won the It's Showtime Heavyweight title after being fouled by Badr Hari.

On October 2 Gerges was a fan voted fighter to fight at the K-1 Final 16 in Seoul, South Korea. He fought four-time and current champion Semmy Schilt. Although fighting very well in the 1st and 3rd round against the much favored Schilt Gerges lost by Majority decision. Because he was only two points away from a draw and had battered the legs of Schilt like no other fighter had ever managed to do before he was chosen to fight at the finals on December 11, 2010, in a reserve fight against Yusuke Fujimoto. This was Fujimoto's retirement match and Gerges won by TKO (3 knockdowns).

However, in 2011 Gerges was not over impressive in his performances, despite going 2-1 by beating Daniel Ghiță and Chris Knowles. He lost to Rico Verhoeven by a narrow split decision in a superfight at the SUPERKOMBAT Fight Club.

On January 28, 2012, he lost to Ghiță in the rematch, by first-round knockout. As a result, he lost his Showtime Heavyweight Title.

He faced Sergei Lascenko at the K-1 World Grand Prix 2012 in Tokyo Final 16 on October 14, 2012. He was able to block the majority of Lascenko's punches while battering the Ukrainian with low kicks, and took the unanimous decision victory.

He faced Carter Williams in a non-tournament bout at the SUPERKOMBAT World Grand Prix 2012 Final in Bucharest, Romania on December 22, 2012, and won by a third-round knockout.

At the K-1 World Grand Prix 2012 Final on March 15, 2013, in Zagreb, Croatia, he faced Ismael Londt in the quarter-finals and bowed out from a broken nose in round three after receiving a flying knee from Londt.

He defeated Pavel Zhuravlev by unanimous decision at Final Fight Championship 6 in Poreč, Croatia on June 14, 2013.

He joined Glory in July 2013.

He lost to Errol Zimmerman by third-round TKO in the tournament reserve match at Glory 11: Chicago - Heavyweight World Championship Tournament in Hoffman Estates, Illinois, United States on October 12, 2013.

He defeated Ewerton Teixeira by unanimous decision at Glory 13: Tokyo - Welterweight World Championship Tournament in Tokyo, Japan on December 21, 2013.

He defeated Jhonata Diniz via second-round TKO at Glory 15: Istanbul in Istanbul, Turkey on April 12, 2014.

Gerges won via disqualification when he was attacked while downed by Jamal Ben Saddik just seconds into their bout at Qabala Fight Series #1 in Qabala, Azerbaijan on June 29, 2014.

In June 2018, Gerges announced that he had signed a multi-fight deal with Bellator and that he would compete both as a Bellator mixed martial artist and kickboxer.

Gerges will make his kickboxing return during Enfusion 98, when he will face Mohamed El Bouchaibi. Gerges defeated El Bouchaibi by a first-round TKO due to low kicks.

Gerges fought Rico Verhoeven in the semifinals of a four-man heavyweight tournament held at Glory 77, and lost by unanimous decision.

Personal life
Gerges was born in Amsterdam, Netherlands and was raised by his Dutch mother and Egyptian stepfather. He is married to women's MMA fighter Denise Kielholtz.

Drug-trafficking conviction
On February 15, 2011, Hesdy Gerges was arrested in Amsterdam under suspicion of being part of a drug deal involving  of cocaine.

His half-brother was arrested May 2010 in a warehouse in Belgium that contained 128 kg of cocaine. Hesdy was already out of the picture in the investigation of 2010, but for some reason the investigation had stalled and he was put back in the picture on February 15, 2011. There was no cocaine or any weapons found in Hesdy residence. His trainer, Thom Harinck spoke with the Dutch Metro News on February 21, and outright said, "Hesdy has been framed. He wakes up at 7:30, at 10:00am he trains with me, rests in the afternoon, then in the evening does strength and conditioning and is in bed by 10:00 PM. I cannot imagine that he still would have time for things like this."

On February 25, 2011, Hesdy Gerges was released from Belgium police.

At the beginning of May 2011, Hesdy was extradited to Belgium to be dealt with as the Belgian authorities suspected that the trafficking ring was going through Belgium. On May 13, 2011, Hesdy was released again and stays with his claim that he is 100% innocent."
At a later trial Gerges was convicted and sentenced to 54 months in prison for drug-trafficking, but didn't have to do any jail time on the condition that he wouldn't commit a crime in Belgium over the next five years.

Doping suspension
On April 20, 2019, it was announced that Gerges failed a drug test prior to Glory 51: Rotterdam. He was issued with an official reprimand. Badr Hari, who faced Gerges at the event, also failed the drug test and was issued with a 19-month suspension after tests on samples provided indicated a violation of Doping Autoriteit Netherlands rules regarding prohibited substances for competitive athletes.

Titles
 It's Showtime
 2010 It's Showtime World Heavyweight Champion 
Kunlun Fight
 2015 Kunlun Fight +100kg World Championship Tournament Runner Up
 World Full Contact Association
 2009 W.F.C.A. World Super Heavyweight Champion
 2008 W.F.C.A. European Super Heavyweight Champion
 2008 W.F.C.A. Benelux Super Heavyweight Champion
 2007 W.F.C.A. Dutch Super Heavyweight Champion
 World Independent Promotor’s Union
 2016 W.I.P.U. "King Of The Ring" Super Heavyweight Champion

Kickboxing record

|-  style="background:#fbb;"
| 2022-10-29 || Loss ||align=left| Rico Verhoeven || HIT IT || Rotterdam, Netherlands || TKO (Punches) || 5 || 1:58
|-
|-  style="background:#fbb;"
| 2021-01-30 || Loss ||align=left| Rico Verhoeven || Glory 77: Rotterdam Semi Final || Rotterdam, Netherlands || Decision (Unanimous) || 3 || 3:00
|-  style="background:#cfc;"
| 2020-10-3|| Win ||align=left| Mohamed El Bouchaibi || Enfusion 98 || Alkmaar, Netherlands || TKO (Low kicks) || 1 ||  1:58
|-  style="background:#c5d2ea;"
| 2018-03-03 || NC ||align=left| Badr Hari || Glory 51: Rotterdam || Rotterdam, Netherlands || No contest || 3 || 3:00 
|-
! style=background:white colspan=9 |
|-
|-  style="background:#fbb;"
| 2017-09-30 || Loss ||align=left| Mladen Brestovac || Glory 45: Amsterdam || Amsterdam, Netherlands || KO (Left high kick) || 1 || 0:36
|-  style="background:#cfc;"
| 2017-05-20 || Win ||align=left| Tomáš Hron || Glory 41: Holland || Den Bosch, Netherlands || Decision (Unanimous) || 3 || 3:00
|-  style="background:#fbb;"
| 2016-11-05 || Loss ||align=left| Benjamin Adegbuyi || Glory 35: Nice, Semi Finals || Nice, France ||Decision (Unanimous) || 3 || 3:00
|-  style="background:#fbb;"
| 2016-09-09 || Loss||align=left| Guto Inocente || Glory 33: New Jersey || Trenton, New Jersey || Decision (split) || 3 || 3:00
|-  style="background:#fbb;"
| 2016-06-25 || Loss||align=left| Ismael Londt || Glory 31: Amsterdam || Amsterdam, Netherlands || Decision (split) || 3 || 3:00
|-  style="background:#cfc;"
| 2016-04-24 || Win ||align=left| Grégory Tony || It's Hardcore Time Again 2 || Meppen, Germany || TKO (retirement) || 1 || 3:00  
|- 
|-  style="background:#fbb;"
| 2015-06-07 || Loss ||align=left| Jahfarr Wilnis || Kunlun Fight 26 - Super Heavyweight Tournament, Final || Chongqing, China || Ext. R. Decision (unanimous) || 4 || 3:00 
|-
! style=background:white colspan=9 | 
|-  style="background:#cfc;"
| 2015-06-07 || Win ||align=left| Andrey Gerasimchuk || Kunlun Fight 26 - Super Heavyweight Tournament, Semi Finals || Chongqing, China || Decision (split) || 3 || 3:00
|-  style="background:#cfc;"
| 2015-03-17 || Win ||align=left| Konstantin Gluhov || Kunlun Fight 21 - Super Heavyweight Tournament, Quarter Finals || Sanya, China || TKO (low kicks)|| 3 || 0:35
|-  style="background:#cfc;"
| 2015-02-01 || Win ||align=left| Igor Bugaenko || Kunlun Fight 18: The Return of the King - Super Heavyweight Tournament, Final 16 || Guangzhou, China ||TKO (low kicks)|| 2 ||   
|-  style="background:#fbb;"
| 2014-11-07 || Loss ||align=left| Benjamin Adegbuyi || Glory 18: Oklahoma || Shawnee, Oklahoma, USA || Decision (unanimous) || 3 || 3:00 
|-
! style=background:white colspan=9 |
|-  style="background:#cfc;"
| 2014-06-29 || Win ||align=left| Jamal Ben Saddik || Qabala Fight Series #1 || Qabala, Azerbaijan || DQ (attack on a downed opponent) || 1 || 0:20
|-  style="background:#cfc;"
| 2014-04-12 || Win ||align=left| Jhonata Diniz || Glory 15: Istanbul || Istanbul, Turkey || TKO (corner stoppage) || 2 || 3:00
|-  style="background:#cfc;"
| 2013-12-21 || Win ||align=left| Ewerton Teixeira || Glory 13: Tokyo || Tokyo, Japan || Decision (unanimous) || 3 || 3:00
|-  style="background:#fbb;"
| 2013-10-12 || Loss ||align=left| Errol Zimmerman || Glory 11: Chicago - Heavyweight World Championship Tournament, Reserve Fight || Hoffman Estates, Illinois, USA || TKO (right hook) || 3 || 0:38
|-  style="background:#cfc;"
| 2013-06-14 || Win ||align=left| Pavel Zhuravlev || FFC06: Jurković vs. Poturak || Poreč, Croatia || Decision (unanimous) || 3 || 3:00
|-  style="background:#fbb;"
| 2013-03-15 || Loss ||align=left| Ismael Londt || K-1 World Grand Prix 2012 Final, Quarter Finals || Zagreb, Croatia || TKO (broken nose) || 3 || 1:42
|-  style="background:#cfc;"
| 2012-12-22 || Win ||align=left| Carter Williams || SUPERKOMBAT World Grand Prix 2012 Final || Bucharest, Romania || KO (left knee) || 3 ||
|-  style="background:#cfc;"
| 2012-10-14 || Win ||align=left| Sergei Lascenko || K-1 World Grand Prix 2012 in Tokyo Final 16, First Round || Tokyo, Japan || Decision (unanimous) || 3 ||3:00
|-  style="background:#fbb;"
| 2012-06-30 || Loss ||align=left| Rico Verhoeven || Music Hall & BFN Group present: It's Showtime 57 & 58 || Brussels, Belgium || Decision (Unanimous) || 3 || 3:00
|-  style="background:#fbb;"
| 2012-01-28 || Loss ||align=left| Daniel Ghiţă || It's Showtime 2012 in Leeuwarden || Leeuwarden, Netherlands || KO (left hook) || 1 || 2:47 
|-
! style=background:white colspan=9 |
|-  style="background:#fbb;"
| 2011-11-17 || Loss ||align=left| Rico Verhoeven || SUPERKOMBAT Fight Club || Oradea, Romania || Decision (split) || 3 || 3:00
|-  style="background:#cfc;"
| 2011-05-21 || Win ||align=left| Chris Knowles || Fightclub presents: It's Showtime 2011 || Amsterdam, Netherlands || KO (punches) || 2 || 0:46
|-  style="background:#cfc;"
| 2011-03-06 || Win  ||align=left| Daniel Ghiţă || It's Showtime Sporthallen Zuid || Amsterdam, Netherlands || Decision (unanimous) || 3 || 3:00
|-  style="background:#cfc;"
| 2010-12-11 || Win ||align=left| Yusuke Fujimoto || K-1 World Grand Prix 2010 Final || Tokyo, Japan || TKO (three knockdown rule) || 1 || 1:41
|-  style="background:#fbb;"
| 2010-10-02 || Loss ||align=left| Semmy Schilt || K-1 World Grand Prix 2010 in Seoul Final 16 || Seoul, South Korea || Decision (majority) || 3 || 3:00
|-  style="background:#cfc;"
| 2010-09-12 || Win ||align=left| Rustemi Kreshnik || Fightingstars presents: It's Showtime 2010 || Amsterdam, Netherlands || TKO (low kicks) || 2 || 2:33
|-  style="background:#cfc;"
| 2010-05-29 || Win ||align=left| Badr Hari || It's Showtime 2010 Amsterdam || Amsterdam, Netherlands || Disqualification || 2 || 
|-
! style=background:white colspan=9 |
|-  style="background:#fbb;"
| 2010-03-13 || Loss ||align=left| Brice Guidon || Oktagon presents: It's Showtime 2010 || Milan, Italy || Ext.R Decision || 4 || 3:00
|-  style="background:#cfc;"
| 2010-02-27|| Win ||align=left| Ashwin Balrak || Amsterdam Fightclub presents: Amsterdam vs Rotterdam || Amsterdam, Netherlands || Decision (unanimous) || 3 || 3:00
|-  style="background:#cfc;"
| 2010-01-09|| Win ||align=left| Paul Slowinski || Ring Sensation Championship: Uprising 12 || Rotterdam, Netherlands || Decision (unanimous) || 3 || 3:00
|-  style="background:#cfc;"
| 2009-12-12|| Win ||align=left| Sebastian van Thielen || Backstreet Fights II || Cologne, Germany || KO || 2 ||
|-  style="background:#cfc;"
| 2009-10-17 || Win ||align=left| Ruslan Karaev || Ultimate Glory 11: A Decade of Fights || Amsterdam, Netherlands || Decision (unanimous) || 3 || 3:00
|-
! style=background:white colspan=9 |
|-  style="background:#cfc;"
| 2009-05-31 || Win ||align=left| Mo Boubkari || Next Generation Warriors || Utrecht, Netherlands || TKO (referee stoppage) || 2 || 1:28
|-  style="background:#fbb;"
| 2009-03-28 || Loss ||align=left| Semmy Schilt || K-1 World Grand Prix 2009 in Yokohama || Yokohama, Japan || Decision (unanimous) || 3 || 3:00
|-  style="background:#fbb;"
| 2009-03-21 || Loss ||align=left| Anderson Silva || VIP Fight Night 2009 || Neuss, Germany || TKO (doctor stoppage/leg injury) || 1 || 2:28 
|-
! style=background:white colspan=9 |
|-  style="background:#cfc;"
| 2009-03-21 || Win ||align=left| Kevin Klinger || VIP Fight Night 2009 || Neuss, Germany || TKO (injury) || 1 || 0:00
|-  style="background:#cfc;"
| 2009-03-21 || Win ||align=left| Aytac Yahsi || VIP Fight Night 2009 || Neuss, Germany || Decision (unanimous) || 3 || 3:00
|-  style="background:#cfc;"
| 2009-03-08 || Win ||align=left| Brian Douwes || Beatdown || Amsterdam, Netherlands || Decision (unanimous) || 3 || 3:00
|-  style="background:#cfc;"
| 2008-11-08 || Win ||align=left| Jan Muller || Ice Cold Assassins ||  || Decision || 5 || 3:00 
|-
! style=background:white colspan=9 |
|-  style="background:#cfc;"
| 2008-10-05 || Win ||align=left| Jerrel Venetiaan || Tough Is Not Enough || Rotterdam, Netherlands || Decision (split) || 3 || 3:00
|-  style="background:#cfc;"
| 2008-09-21 || Win ||align=left| Mutlu Karabulut || SLAMM Events presents "Back to the Old School" || Amsterdam, Netherlands || Decision (unanimous) || 3 || 3:00 
|-
! style=background:white colspan=9 |
|-  style="background:#cfc;"
| 2008-07-05 || Win ||align=left| Ricardo van den Bos  || Amsterdam Fightclub || Amsterdam, Netherlands || Decision (unanimous) || 3 || 3:00
|-
! style=background:white colspan=9 |
|-  style="background:#fbb;"
| 2008-02-17 || Loss ||align=left| Mourad Bouzidi || K-1 MAX Netherlands 2008 The Final Qualification || Utrecht, Netherlands || Decision (unanimous) || 3 || 3:00
|-  style="background:#cfc;"
| 2007-09-23 || Win ||align=left| Wendell Roche || Rings Holland: Risky Business || Utrecht, Netherlands || Decision (unanimous) || 3 || 3:00
|-  style="background:#cfc;"
| 2007-06-02 || Win ||align=left| Bob van Boxmeer || Gentleman Fight Night 2007 || Tilburg, Netherlands || TKO (doctor stoppage/injury) || 1 || 3:00 
|-
! style=background:white colspan=9 |
|-  style="background:#cfc;"
| 2007-06-02 || Win ||align=left| Mo Boubkari || Next Generation Warriors || Tilburg, Netherlands || Decision (unanimous) || 3 || 3:00
|-  style="background:#fbb;"
| 2007-03-12 || Loss ||align=left| Ginty Vrede || Rings "The Chosen Ones" || Utrecht, Netherlands  || TKO (referee stoppage) || 1 ||
|-  style="background:#cfc;"
| 2006-09-17 || Draw ||align=left| Rick van Soest || Rings Kickboxing Gala in Amsterveen || Amstelveen, Netherlands || Decision || 3 || 3:00 
|-  style="background:#fbb;"
| 2006-06-02 || Loss ||align=left| Daniele Petroni || The King of Kings II || Milan, Italy  || Decision (unanimous) || 5 || 3:00 
|-
! style=background:white colspan=9 |
|-  style="background:#cfc;"
| 2006-05-27 || Win ||align=left| Roy Dijkshoorn || Muay Thai Gala in Zonnehuis || Amsterdam, Netherlands || KO || 1 || 
|-  style="background:#cfc;"
| 2006-04-22 || Win ||align=left| Errol Turgut || Gala in Amsterdam || Amsterdam, Netherlands || Decision (unanimous) || 5 || 2:00 
|-  style="background:#cfc;"
| 2006-03-18 || Win ||align=left| Nordin Zourdani || Beatdown II || Amsterdam, Netherlands || Decision (unanimous) || 5 || 2:00  
|-  style="background:#cfc;"
| 2006-02-12 || Win ||align=left| Amir el Alfi || Powerzone || Amsterdam, Netherlands || TKO || ||  
|-  style="background:#cfc;"
| 2005-12-18 || Win ||align=left| Marcel van Bekkum || Gala in Zonnehuis || Amsterdam, Netherlands || KO || ||
|-  style="background:#fbb;"
| 2004-10-24 || Loss ||align=left| Brian Douwes || Fight Gala in Beverwijk || Beverwijk, Netherlands || KO || 2 || 
|-  style="background:#cfc;"
| 2004-09-18 || Win ||align=left| Rein Zijlstra || Gala in Zilvermeeuwen || Amsterdam, Netherlands || KO || 1 ||
|-  style="background:#cfc;"
| 2003-12-12 || Win ||align=left| Ricardo van Kooten || Kamakura Team Muay Thai Gala || Katwijk, Netherlands || Decision || 3 || 2:00
|-  style="background:#fbb;"
| 2003-10-25 || Loss ||align=left| Jerrel Blankers || Gala in Zonnehuis || Amsterdam, Netherlands || TKO (referee stoppage) || || 
|-
| colspan=9 | Legend:

Mixed martial arts record

|-
| Loss
| align=center|0–2
| Dragos Zubco	
| Decision (Unanimous)
| Bellator 230
| 
| align=center| 3
| align=center| 5:00
| Milan, Italy
| 
|-
| Loss
| align=center|0–1
| Domingos Barros
| TKO (Punches)
| Bellator 211
| 
| align=center|1
| align=center|3:52
| Genoa, Italy
|

See also
List of male kickboxers

References

External links
Profile at Glory

1984 births
Living people
Dutch male kickboxers
Heavyweight kickboxers
Dutch Muay Thai practitioners
Dutch male mixed martial artists
Heavyweight mixed martial artists
Mixed martial artists utilizing Muay Thai
Sportspeople from Amsterdam
People extradited from the Netherlands
People extradited to Belgium
People convicted of drug offenses
Kunlun Fight kickboxers
Glory kickboxers
SUPERKOMBAT kickboxers
Doping cases in kickboxing
Dutch sportspeople in doping cases